The sport of association football in the United States territory of Guam is run by the Guam Football Association. The association administers the national football team, as well as the Guam League.

League system

Football stadiums in Guam

References